La Difference: A History Unplugged is a 2016 greatest hits album by Canadian alternative rock band 54•40 recorded at Blue Frog Studios in White Rock, British Columbia. The album features ten unplugged intimate tracks that have been re-imagined and re-recorded by the band with the use of additional instrumentation.

Long time guitarist Dave Genn has this to say about the new effort:

"What a privilege to be able to reimagine our catalogue in a way that is equal parts fresh and familiar. Given the opportunity to frame Neil's lyrics in a different light reminded me of the emotional connection between the words and music, and how that connection can be massaged in order to give the songs new moods and meanings. A thoroughly inspiring exercise, and a labour of love!"

Track listing

References

2016 albums
54-40 albums